Marta Cavallo Bunge (1938 – 25 October 2022) was an Argentine-Canadian mathematician specializing in category theory, and known for her work on synthetic calculus of variations and synthetic differential topology. She was a professor emeritus at McGill University.

Education and career
Bunge was a student at a teacher's college in Buenos Aires, the daughter of Ricardo and María-Teresa Cavallo.
She met Argentine philosopher Mario Bunge while auditing one of his courses, and they eloped in late 1958 (as his second marriage).

Bunge earned her Ph.D. from the University of Pennsylvania in 1966. Her dissertation, Categories of Set Valued Functors, was jointly supervised by Peter J. Freyd and William Lawvere.
When she was offered a postdoctoral research position at McGill in 1966, her husband followed her there, and they remained in Canada afterwards.
She became an assistant professor at McGill in 1969, was promoted to full professor in 1985, and retired as a professor emeritus in 2003.

Books
With her doctoral student Jonathon Funk, Bunge is the co-author of Singular Coverings of Toposes (Lecture Notes in Mathematics 1890, Springer, 2006).
With Felipe Gago and Ana María San Luis, Bunge is the co-author of Synthetic Differential Topology (London Mathematical Society Lecture Note Series 448, Cambridge University Press, 2018).

References

External links
Home page

1938 births
2022 deaths
Argentine mathematicians
Canadian mathematicians
Argentine women mathematicians
Academic staff of McGill University
People from Buenos Aires